Leon Israr Bashir is a Norwegian actor, screenwriter and film director.

Career 
Bashir started his acting career on 1997. As an actor, Bashir is best known for the films Izzat, Tomme Tønner and the TV series Codename Hunter. He has also appeared in the TV series Familiesagaen De syv søstre, Fox Grønland and Schpaaa. As a screenwriter, he has written screenplays for the films Izzat and Tomme Tønner. He was nominated for Best Actor award at Amanda Award for his role in Gjengangere.

Filmography

Actor 
 Gjengangere (2017)
 Tomme Tønner 2 – Det brune gullet (2011)
 Kodenavn Hunter (2007)
 Tomme Tønner (2010)
 Izzat (2005)
 Fox Grønland (2001)
 Schpaaa (1998)
 Familiesagaen De syv søstre (1997–2000)

Screenwriter 
 Gjengangere (2017)
 Tomme Tønner 2 – Det brune gullet (2011)
 Tomme Tønner (2010)
 Izzat (2005)

Director 
 Gjengangere (2017)
 Tomme Tønner (2010)

References

External links

Norwegian film directors
20th-century Norwegian male actors
21st-century Norwegian male actors
Norwegian people of Pakistani descent
1979 births
Living people
Norwegian male film actors
Male actors from Oslo